Bord Iascaigh Mhara (meaning "Sea Fish Board" or "Irish Sea Fisheries Board"; BIM) is the agency of the Irish state with responsibility for developing the Irish marine fishing and aquaculture industries.

Originally established under the Sea Fisheries Act, 1952, the organisation serves to provide resources to the fishing industry, particularly in aquaculture, as well as providing an interface to the consumer for information and promotion of seafood.  Historically it operated boatyards in Baltimore, Dingle and Killybegs.

BIM headquarters is currently located in Dún Laoghaire, County Dublin.

References

External links
 Official site

Environment of the Republic of Ireland
Fishing in Ireland
Dún Laoghaire
1952 establishments in Ireland
State-sponsored bodies of the Republic of Ireland